Immanuel Christian School may refer to:

Immanuel Christian School, New Zealand, in Auckland
Immanuel Christian School (Winnipeg), Manitoba, Canada
Immanuel Christian School (Pontianak), Indonesia
Immanuel Christian School (Springfield), Virginia, United States